The Russo-Persian War of 1826–1828 was the last major military conflict between the Russian Empire and Persia.

After the Treaty of Gulistan that concluded the previous Russo-Persian War in 1813, peace reigned in the Caucasus for thirteen years. However, Fath 'Ali Shah, constantly in need of foreign subsidies, relied on the advice of British agents, who advised him to reconquer the territories lost to the Russian Empire and pledged their support for military action. The matter was decided upon in spring 1826, when a bellicose party of Abbas Mirza prevailed in Tehran and the Russian minister, Aleksandr Sergeyevich Menshikov, was placed under house arrest.

The war ended in 1828 following the occupation of Tabriz. The war had even more disastrous results for Persia than the 1804–1813 war, as the ensuing Treaty of Turkmenchay stripped Persia of its last remaining territories in the Caucasus, which comprised all of modern Armenia, the southern remainder of modern Azerbaijan, and modern Iğdır in Turkey. Through the Gulistan and Turkmenchay treaties Persia lost all of its territories in the Caucasus to Russia.  These territories had once extended throughout most of Transcaucasia and part of the North Caucasus.

The war marked the end of the era of the Russo-Persian Wars, with Russia now the unquestioned dominant power in the Caucasus. Persia (Iran) was forced to cede swaths of territories that it never regained. The conquered territories spent more than 160 years under Russian domination before establishing their independence, except Dagestan, which is still a Russian possession. In 1991, through the dissolution of the USSR, the modern states of Georgia, Azerbaijan, and Armenia were established from the bulk of the South Caucasus territories that had come under the dominion of Russia by 1828.

As a direct result of the Gulistan and Turkmenchay treaties arising from the two Russo-Persian Wars of the 19th century, the Azerbaijanis and Talysh people are divided between two nations (Azerbaijan and Iran).

1826: Persian invasion and Russian response

In May 1826, Mirak was occupied by Russian troops, against the wishes of Czar Nicholas I. In response, the Persian government sent Mirza Mohammad Sadiq to St. Petersburg in an attempt to discuss the issue. However, Caucasus General Governor Aleksey Yermolov had Sadiq detained at Tiflis.

Without a declaration of war, on 19 July 1826 (all dates old style, so add 12 days for the Western calendar) a 35,000-strong army led by Abbas Mirza invaded Karabakh and Talysh, and did a good deal of damage. The local Khans switched sides. Bombak and Shuragel (near Gyumri) were overrun from Yerevan. Gyumri was blockaded, but the garrison managed to escape, while 1000 men surrendered at Ak-Kara-Chay. Shusha, the capital of Karabakh, was besieged, Lenkoran and Elisabethpol (formerly Ganja) abandoned, and Baku besieged.  Yermolov remained strangely inactive, partly because he had only 3,500 men. He asked for more, and Nicholas sent one division and 6 regiments of Don Cossack cavalry, telling Yermolov to invade the Yerevan Khanate. Yermolov replied that this was impossible and Nicholas replied by sending out Ivan Paskevich.  This roused Yermolov, who sent Valerian Madatov south with instructions not to risk a major battle.  Madatov disobeyed and on 2 September he defeated a Persian army and relieved the siege of Shusha. The Russians reentered Elisabethpol.  The reinforcements arrived, as did Paskevich who took command of the army from Yermolov. On 14 September he routed another Persian army on the Akstafa River 18 miles west of Elisabethpol.

1827: Russian counter-invasion and victory

Yermolov’s position was now untenable and on 28 March 1827 he turned over all his powers to Paskevich. In April 1827 or earlier Benckendorff occupied without resistance the monastery of Echmiadzin, the Armenian ‘Rome’, and then invested Yerevan. Paskevich joined him on 15 June. Finding Benckendorf’s men exhausted he replaced them with fresh troops under  and set off south for Nakhichivan, the capital of that khanate.  His purpose was to threaten Abbas Mirza’s capital of Tabriz and block any relief of Yerevan from that direction.  He entered Nakhichivan unopposed on 26 June and the khanate became a Russian province. Sickness broke out and the supply convoys were late, so Paskevich did not push on to Tabriz.

Meanwhile, on 21 June, Krasovsky was forced to raise the siege of Yerevan due to the condition of his troops. He left one regiment at Echmiadzin and retired further north.  At this point Abbas Mirza struck. His plan was to bypass Paskevich on the west and take Echmiadzin and Gyumri, devastate Tiflis and return through Karabakh.  Krasovsky was forced to return south to relieve Echmiadzin (16 August). He had 1800 infantry, 500 cavalry and 12 guns. The distance was only 33 kilometers but the terrain was difficult, the heat was terrible and 30000 Persians blocked the way.  At the battle of Ashtarak the Russians cut their way through and relieved Echmiadzin at the cost of half their number. The Persians withdrew south with a loss of only 400 men. It is said that if Krasovsky had not garrisoned the monastery he could have met Abbas Mirza on ground of his own choosing, but the thing was done and it worked.

When word reached Paskevich he abandoned any plans to move south and returned to Echmiadzin (5 September). Moving east he captured the fort of Serdar-Abad and on 23 September appeared before the walls of Yerevan. When the place fell he was promoted to non-commissioned officer. Yerevan fell on 14 October. 4000 prisoners and 49 guns were taken and the Yerevan Khanate became a Russian province.

When Pashkevich left Nakhichivan he entrusted the area to Prince Eristov, a Georgian, with Muravyov as his lieutenant. He gave them strict instructions to merely guard the province and make no aggressive move.  Abbas Mirza did the obvious thing. Crossing the Aras unopposed he found himself facing Eristov with 4000 men and 26 guns, far more than he expected. Abbas withdrew, Eristov chased him for a while and returned to Nakhichivan. So far they were within their orders. When they heard that the Persian army was in a state of complete demoralization the temptation was too great. Setting off on 30 September they reached a place called Maraud, Abbas got behind them, but when news of the fall of Yerevan reached them the Persian army was seized with panic and dispersed.  Muravyov now chose to be bold, or foolish. Concealing his plans from everyone including Eristov he left Marand on 23 October and headed south.  By 25 October they were a few miles from Tabriz. The garrison fled, driven out, it is said, by the inhabitants. The gates were opened and the ancient and wealthy city of 60,000 inhabitants was occupied without opposition. Peace negotiations began immediately, but dragged on. Fighting resumed in January but the Persian army was too demoralized to fight. Urmia was occupied on January 28 and Ardebil opened its gates on February 8. The Treaty of Turkmenchay was signed on 22 February 1828 giving the khanates of Erivan and Nakhichevan to Russia. On 20 March 1828 Paskevich learned that Russia was now at war with the Ottoman Empire.

Aftermath 

By the Turkmenchay treaty, Russia completed the conquest of almost all Caucasian territories from Iran, having previously gained Georgia, Dagestan, and most of modern-day Azerbaijan through the 1813 Treaty of Gulistan. According to the terms of this treaty, the Khanates of Erivan and Nakhichevan passed to Russia, encompassing modern day Armenia, and the remaining part of the contemporary Azerbaijan Republic that still remained in Iranian hands, as well as a small part of Eastern Anatolia, namely Iğdır (now part of Turkey). The Shah promised to pay an indemnity of 20,000,000 silver roubles and allowed his Armenian subjects to migrate to Russian territory without any hindrance. This were to cause significant demographic shifts in the Caucasus as well as within the newly established borders of Iran, especially as the effects were combined with the Treaty of Adrianople of a year later. More importantly, the Shah granted the Russians the exclusive right to maintain a navy in the Caspian and agreed that Russian merchants were free to trade anywhere they wanted in Persia.

In the short term, the treaty undermined the position of the British Empire in Persia and marked a new stage in the Great Game between the two empires. In the long term, the treaty ensured the dependence of the Caucasus on Russia, thus making possible the eventual emergence of the modern states of Armenia and Azerbaijan on the territories conquered from Iran during the war, as well as the direct reason in combination with the 1813 Gulistan treaty for the decisive partition of the Azerbaijani and Talysh peoples between nowadays Iran and Azerbaijan.

See also 
 Russo-Persian Wars
 Khanates of the Caucasus
 Russo-Turkish War (1828–1829)

References 
Inline

General
 N. Dubrovin. История войны и владычества русских на Кавказе, volumes 4-6. SPb, 1886-88.
 Gen. V.A. Potto. Кавказская война..., volumes 1-5. SPb, 1885–86, reprinted in 2006. .

1826
1820s in Asia
Invasions of Iran
Invasions by Russia
Conflicts in 1826
Conflicts in 1827
Conflicts in 1828
1820s in the Russian Empire
1820s in Iran
1820s in Georgia (country)
19th century in Armenia
19th century in Azerbaijan
19th-century military history of the Russian Empire
Caucasus Viceroyalty (1801–1917)
Khanates of the South Caucasus
Wars involving Iran
Wars involving Qajar Iran
Wars involving Russia
19th century in Iran
19th century in the Russian Empire
Nicholas I of Russia